Szymon Walków (born 22 September 1995) is a Polish tennis player who specialises in doubles. He has a career high ATP singles ranking of World No. 818 achieved on 3 December 2018. He also has a career high doubles ranking of World No. 86 achieved on 13 June 2022. He has reached one ATP doubles final. Additionally, he has reached 40 career doubles finals with a record of 23 wins and 17 losses, which includes a 11–7 record in ATP Challenger Tour doubles finals. He reached one singles final, winning the title at the Poland F4 futures tournament in Koszalin in 2018.

Career
Walków reached his maiden ATP doubles final at the 2021 Swiss Open Gstaad partnering Jan Zieliński.

In January 2022, he made his debut participating as part of the Polish team at the 2022 ATP Cup, where he played doubles with Zieliński and won against Georgia and Argentina. After Hurkacz's win over Diego Schwartzman sealed the victory for Poland over Argentina the Polish team advanced to the semifinals. The pair won again against Spain in doubles but the team did not advance to the finals.

ATP career finals

Doubles: 1 (1 runner-up)

ATP Challenger and ITF Futures finals

Singles: 1 (1–0)

Doubles: 41 (23–18)

References

External links
 
 

1995 births
Living people
Polish male tennis players
Sportspeople from Wrocław